Ahmed Sulaiman (Arabic:أحمد سليمان) (born 29 August 1987) is an Emirati footballer. He currently plays for Hatta.

External links

References

Emirati footballers
1987 births
Living people
Al-Ittihad Kalba SC players
Al Dhafra FC players
Al Shabab Al Arabi Club Dubai players
Al Bataeh Club players
Hatta Club players
UAE First Division League players
UAE Pro League players
Association football defenders